Najd FC  is a Saudi Arabian football (soccer) team in H̨awţah Sudayr playing at the Saudi Fourth Division.

Stadium

References

Najd
Association football clubs established in 1976
1976 establishments in Saudi Arabia